The Twenty-Eight Mansions, also called  or , are part of the Chinese constellations system. They can be considered as the equivalent to the zodiacal constellations in Western astronomy, though the Twenty-eight Mansions reflect the movement of the Moon through a sidereal month rather than the Sun in a tropical year.  

The lunar mansion system was in use in other parts of East Asia, such as ancient Japan; the Bansenshukai, written by Fujibayashi Yasutake, mentions the system several times and includes an image of the twenty-eight mansions.

A similar system, called nakshatra, is used in traditional Indian astronomy.

Overview 

Ancient Chinese astronomers divided the sky ecliptic into four regions, collectively known as the Four Symbols, each assigned a mysterious animal. They are Azure Dragon (青龍) on the east, Black Tortoise (玄武) on the north, White Tiger (白虎) on the west, and Vermilion Bird (朱雀) on the south. Each region contains seven mansions, making a total of 28 mansions. These mansions or xiù correspond to the longitudes along the ecliptic that the Moon crosses during its 27.32-day journey around the Earth and serve as a way to track the Moon's progress. In Taoism they are related to 28 Chinese generals.

List of mansions 
The names and determinative stars of the mansions are:

See also 

 Four Symbols (Chinese constellation)
 Lunar mansion
 Three enclosures

References 

Chinese constellations
Cultural lists
Technical factors of Chinese astrology